Strength tester may refer to:

A strength tester machine, a type of amusement, which upon receiving credit rates the subject's strength
 A high striker, a strength tester utilizing a lever and a puck specifically
 Grippers, used to test the strength of the hands

See also
Strength athletics
Izod impact strength test
Shear strength test
Container compression test
Universal testing machine